The Pistolet modèle An XIII was a flintlock cavalry pistol, in service in French units from 1806.

The Pistolet modèle An XIII was mostly inspired by the Pistolet modèle An IX, which it succeeded, but also incorporated elements of the Navy pistolet modèle 1786, notably the barrel mountings. Over 300 000 pistols were made, mostly between 1806 and 1814 in Charleville, Maubeuge and St-Etienne. The Americans copied the design as the Harpers Ferry Pistol, and used it against the British during the War of 1812.

The Pistolet modèle An XIII was designed to equip mounted units, each horseman using two pistols. It was also used by the Navy. An improved version, known as the M1822, was produced after the Napoleonic Wars. They were kept in service well into the 1840s, at which date the pistols still in usage were converted to use percussion caps.

Sources and references 

 Le pistolet de 17,1 mm de cavalerie modèle an XIII

Firearms of France
Single-shot pistols
Black-powder pistols